Thierry Junquet is a former French slalom canoeist who competed from the late 1970s to the early 1980s. He won a bronze medal in the K-1 team event at the 1981 ICF Canoe Slalom World Championships in Bala.

References

French male canoeists
Living people
Year of birth missing (living people)
Medalists at the ICF Canoe Slalom World Championships